Clear Lake is a mountain lake  southeast of Portland, Oregon, United States in Mount Hood National Forest. It can be seen from flights in the region as a bird-shaped body of water.

It is near the northwest corner of Wasco County. The Pacific Crest Trail is 4 km (2 mi) west of the lake.

It is fed by several small streams of the eastern Cascade crest. It is the headwaters of Clear Creek, a tributary of the White River, blocked at the east end by the Wasco Dam.  The earthen dam was a 1959 irrigation project of the United States Bureau of Reclamation, 59 feet high and 1901 feet long at its crest.

The lake is known for abundant fish and its windy conditions. The banks are edged by tree stumps and free range cattle tracks. The campground has 28 established spots and an overflow area.

See also
 Clear Lake (Oregon), for other lakes with the name
 List of lakes in Oregon

References

Lakes of Oregon
Lakes of Wasco County, Oregon
Protected areas of Wasco County, Oregon
Mount Hood National Forest